Allan A. Schoenherr (February 6, 1937 – May 31, 2021) was a Californian author, ecologist, and naturalist. He is the author of the widely used reference book, A Natural History of California.

He received his PhD in zoology at Arizona State University and taught a long-running course on natural history of California University of California, Irvine.   He is emeritus professor of ecology in Fullerton College. He taught classes for the Desert Institute of the Joshua Tree National Park Association.

An accomplished nature photographer, he has provided the photographs to illustrate his books and he has received two awards for his images of California Gray Whales. A lover of the outdoors, he has traveled, hiked, and photographed all over the world. He has been the naturalist on many shipboard excursions including trips to Iceland, Greenland, Russia, Alaska, the Arctic and the Antarctic, the lagoons of Baja California, the South Pacific, and the Caribbean. As a biology professor on the Semester at Sea program he has four times traveled around the world teaching marine biology and ecology. He was the coordinator of Global Studies on the Spring ‘09 voyage of the Semester at Sea program.

He was a professor of biology at Fullerton College for over 30 years.  He died at 84 at his cabin in the Sierra Nevada outside Bishop 31 May 2021.

Bibliography

Books
 The herpetofauna of the San Gabriel Mountains, Los Angeles County, California (1976)
 A Natural History of California (1995)
 Natural History of the Islands of California (2003)
 Terrestrial Vegetation of California (2007), editor with Michael Barbour and Todd Keeler-Wolf
 Wild and Beautiful: A Natural History of the Open Spaces in Orange County (2013)
 A Natural history of California Second Edition (2017)

Academic publications

References

Living people
American ecologists
American naturalists
Arizona State University alumni
1937 births